Return, also Homecoming, is a 2010 Finnish short film directed by Harri J. Rantala and starring Eerik Kantokoski, Reeta Annala, Kalevi Haapoja and Kauko Salo.

Plot
In spring 1940, a soldier is returning from the Finnish Winter War only to face the Repo man. A struggle against society, nightmares and the temptations of alcohol ensues while he strives to save his farm and marriage.

Cast
 Eerik Kantokoski as Erkki 
 Reeta Annala as Enni 
 Kalevi Haapoja as Preacher 
 Kauko Salo as Repo man
 Antti Nelimarkka as Repo man

Film festivals
Return' has been screened round the world in 36 festivals in 21 countries.

Primary festivals
63rd Cannes Film Festival, Cannes France 2010 (Short Film Corner)
8th Ischia International Film Festival, Ischia Italy 2010 (Official Competition) 
12th Motovun Film Festival, Motovun Croatia 2010 (Official Competition)
8th Cinefiesta International Film Festival, San Juan Puerto Rico 2010 (Official Competition)
6th Budapest International Short Film Festival, Budapest Hungary 2010 (Official Competition)
15th Ourense International Film Festival, Ourense Spain 2010 (Official Competition)
18th Santiago International Film Festival, Santiago Chile 2010 (Official Competition)
30th Amiens International Film Festival, Amiens France 2010 (Official Competition)
22nd Ankara International Film Festival, Ankara Turkey 2011 (Official Competition)
34th Grenzland-Filmtage Film Festival, Selb Germany 2011 (Official Competition)
2nd Vientianale International Film Festival, Vientiane Laos 2011 (Official Competition)
5th Portello River Film Festival, Padova Italy 2011 (Official Competition)
8th Golden Apricot Yerevan International Film Festival, Yerevan Armenia 2011 (Official Competition)
10th Dokufest International Film Festival, Prizren Kosovo 2011 (Official Competition)
6th Cyprus International Film Festival, Nicosia Cypros 2011 (Official Competition)
13th Patras City International Film Festival, Patras City Greece 2011 (Official Competition)
6th London Film For Peace International Film Festival, London UK 2011 (Official Competition)
2nd Artova Film Festival, Helsinki Finland 2011

References

External links
 
 

Films directed by Harri J. Rantala
2010s Finnish-language films
2010 films
Finnish short films
2010 short films